Spencer Johnson (born 16 December 1995) is an Australian first-class cricketer who plays for South Australia.

He made his List A debut on 12 October 2017 for South Australia against Victoria. He made his First class debut on 20 February 2023 for South Australia in the 2022–23 Sheffield Shield season tournament.

Domestic career

Johnson made his List A debut in the 2017–18 JLT One-Day Cup playing for South Australia in the 15th match against Victoria. He did not bat, but he bowled 10 overs and took one wicket for 72 runs. South Australia won the match by 11 runs. Despite being delisted by South Australia ahead of the 2020/21 season, Johnson returned to the squad for the 2020-21 Marsh One-Day Cup after impressive performances in South Australian Premier Cricket.

Johnson was named in the Adelaide Strikers squad ahead of the 2020-21 Big Bash League season, however did not feature in the tournament.

Johnson made his debut in the BBL in the 2022–23 season on 11 January 2023, for the Brisbane Heat.

References

External links

Living people
1995 births
Cricketers from South Australia
South Australia cricketers